Nasusina minuta is a moth in the family Geometridae first described by George Duryea Hulst in 1896. It is found in the United States in the desert regions of southern California, western Arizona and Nevada.

The wingspan is about 14–16 mm. The wings are light gray with a slight ocherous tinge. The maculation (spotting) of the forewings is obscure, but in well-marked specimens the median area is shaded with smoky and forms an oblique band across the wing. The discal dot is quite minute. The hindwings are largely dull whitish with smoky shading along the inner margin. Adults have been recorded on wing from March to June and in August and in November.

References

Moths described in 1896
Eupitheciini